Ken Burrow (born March 29, 1948 in Richmond, California) is a former professional American football player who played wide receiver for five seasons for the Atlanta Falcons.  He scored 21 touchdowns, 2693 yards (2668 receiving on 152 receptions).  He played college ball at San Diego State University and high school at De Anza High School.

References

1948 births
Living people
Sportspeople from Richmond, California
Players of American football from California
American football wide receivers
San Diego State Aztecs football players
Atlanta Falcons players
Pinole, California